USS Phobos (AK-129) was a  commissioned by the U.S. Navy for service in World War II. She was responsible for delivering troops, goods and equipment to locations in the war zone.

Phobos (AK–129) was laid down as SS Joseph H. Kibbey under Maritime Commission contract by Todd Houston Shipbuilding Co., Houston, Texas, 25 September 1943; launched 6 November 1943; sponsored by Mrs. J. S. Burrows; and delivered to the Maritime Commission 17 November 1943 for operation by the American Export Lines. Following one cruise as a merchant vessel, SS Joseph H. Kibbey was acquired by the Army Transportation Service for use as a troop transport. While under conversion at Todd-Johnson Dry Docks, Inc., New Orleans, Louisiana, she was reassigned to the Navy and named Phobos 15 January 1944. She was accepted by the Navy 12 June 1944 and commissioned the same day at Algiers, Louisiana.

World War II Pacific Theatre operations 
 
Phobos steamed to the U.S. East Coast late in June; and, after shakedown in Chesapeake Bay, she loaded dry stores for fleet issue and departed Norfolk, Virginia, 29 July.

Supplying ships for the invasion of Leyte 

She transited the Panama Canal 6 August en route to the South Pacific Ocean. Arriving Manus, Admiralties, 15 September, she began duty with Service Squadron 10. Assigned to TG 30.9, Phobos supplied ships during final preparations for the impending invasion of the Philippines at Leyte. Thence, with U.S. Marine casualties of the Palaus embarked, she sailed to Nouméa, New Caledonia, between 29 October and 7 November.
 
After replenishing her holds, Phobos departed 18 November and during the rest of the month she provisioned ships of the U.S. 7th Fleet in the New Hebrides and New Guinea. On 5 December she returned to Manus where she continued issuing supplies to ships preparing for operations at Lingayen Gulf, Luzon. She completed her duty late in the month and sailed for the United States 29 December with 133 Leyte veterans embarked.

Supporting the 5th fleet 
 
Phobos arrived San Francisco, California, 23 January 1945. After overhaul and loading cargo she deployed to the western Pacific 25 February, via Pearl Harbor and Eniwetok, reaching Ulithi, 24 March. During the next three months she served at this important American base and replenished ships of the U.S. 5th Fleet during the Okinawa campaign and strikes on the home islands of Japan. Between 20 June and 5 July, she sailed to Pearl Harbor where she was stocking her holds in preparation for the scheduled invasion of Japan when the Japanese ceased hostilities.

End-of-war activity 
 
In mid-September Phobos steamed to the Marshalls where she provisioned ships before sailing to the Far East 15 October. She reached Okinawa the 23d and resumed supply operations. Between 4 and 7 November the cargo ship sailed to Japan for fleet issue duty under Service Division 102. During the next month she operated out of Tokyo Bay supplying provisions and medical stores.

Post-war decommissioning 
 
Phobos departed for the United States 15 December via Pearl Harbor, arriving San Francisco 7 January 1946. She decommissioned there 22 March 1946 and transferred the same day to the Maritime Commission for delivery to the U.S. Coast Guard. Her name was struck from the Naval Vessel Register 17 April 1946. Final Disposition: she was scrapped at Oakland, California, in 1970.

Military awards and honors 

No battle stars are indicated for Phobos in current Navy records. However, her crew was eligible for the following medals:
 American Campaign Medal
 Asiatic-Pacific Campaign Medal
 World War II Victory Medal
 Navy Occupation Service Medal (with Asia clasp)

References

External links
 

 

Crater-class cargo ships
World War II auxiliary ships of the United States
Ships built in Houston
1943 ships